John Elford (born 1 March 1947) is an Australian former rugby league footballer who played in the 1960s and 1970s. He played his entire first grade Australian club football for Western Suburbs and also played for both the New South Wales and Australia representative sides. He was described as, "A great defender and a confident ball player."

Background
Elford was born in Casino, New South Wales, Australia.

Playing career
Hailing from Casino, Elford was a Surf lifesaving sprint champion before starting his professional league career. He came to the Western Suburbs club in 1966 as a winger but later was shifted to the forwards where he remained the rest of his career. By 1968 he was playing on the wing for Sydney Seconds.

In 1969 Elford appealed against the league's transfer and retention system, that prevented him from joining another club. He claimed that players had attended training with the "smell of alcohol on their breath," and they, "later became sick on the field." He went on to accuse a coach of wanting, "to fight everyone in the first grade behind a shed, one at a time" He took no part in the 1969 season.

Despite his previous problems with Magpies, he signed a contract to stay with the club for five years at the start of 1972. Later that year he made his representative debut for New South Wales, in what was described as, "a powerhouse display," by, "a rugged young second-rower who delights in the role of crashing defence and can split the opposition in attacking bursts."

Elford was then subsequently selected for the Australian national side that same year, scoring two tries in a match against New Zealand. He would be selected for the Australian side in the 1972 Rugby League World Cup held in France but broke his arm in a warm-up fixture prior to the tournament and could not take part. He is listed on the Australian Players Register as Kangaroo No. 461.

His promising career was however often halted by injuries, and he was forced out of the entire 1973 season. In 1975, the tendons were operated on and he had a new plate placed in his arm. His career finished in 1976 after another broken arm.

References

Sources
 

1947 births
Living people
Australian rugby league players
Western Suburbs Magpies players
Australia national rugby league team players
Rugby league players from Casino, New South Wales
Rugby league second-rows
New South Wales rugby league team players
Date of birth missing (living people)